Justice Waterman may refer to:

Charles M. Waterman (judge), associate justice of the Iowa Supreme Court
Thomas D. Waterman, associate justice of the Iowa Supreme Court